The Pingat Polis Keberanian, also known as the Police Gallantry Medal, is awarded to officers of the Singapore Police Force (SPF) who display exceptional courage during situations of danger. Since its constitution, the medal has been awarded to nine recipients, with the first awarded in 1988 to D/Sgt Madhavan s/o Govinda Nair for his courageous attempts to stop a robbery at Fook Hai Building on 4 June 1988. Two medals were awarded posthumously in 1994 to Sgt Hoi Kim Heng and SI Boo Tiang Huat, after they were killed in the line of duty on separate incidents which occurred on 21 May 1994 and 30 November 1994 respectively.

No further medals were awarded until the year 2003 when six medals were awarded to a crew of Police Coast Guard officers led by DSP1 Tan Wee Wah Stephen who responded and conducted rescue efforts after a collision of the Republic of Singapore Navy's RSS Courageous and a merchant ship, ANL Indonesia which occurred on 3 January 2003.

Award recipients
1988: D/Sgt Madhavan S/O Govinda Nair
1994: Sgt Hoi Kim Heng (posthumous)
1994: SI Boo Tiang Huat (posthumous)
2003: DSP1 Tan Wee Wah Stephen
2003: SSS Mohammad Ramli Bin Mohammad Shariff
2003: Sgt Lee Swee Keng Darren
2003: Sgt Mohammad Faizal Bin Ali
2003: Cpl (NS) Teo Seng Guan Don
2003: Cpl (NS) Sukiman Bin Isnin

References

Civil awards and decorations of Singapore
Singapore Police Force
Awards established in 1988